Palikura is a village in the municipality of Rosoman, North Macedonia.

Demographics
According to the statistics of the Bulgarian ethnographer Vasil Kanchov from 1900, 130 inhabitants lived in Palikura, all Christian Bulgarians. On the 1927 ethnic map of Leonhard Schulze-Jena, the village is written as "Çiftlik Palikura" and shown as a Christian Bulgarian village. According to the 2002 census, the village had a total of 183 inhabitants. Ethnic groups in the village include:

Macedonians 161
Serbs 17
Romani 4
Others 1

References

Villages in Rosoman Municipality